

UAE Handball Super Cup

The UAE Handball Super Cup is one of the professional handball competitions in the United Arab Emirates (UAE). The Super Cup was founded in 1999 as the UAE Handball Super Cup. The first 1999–00 season was won by Al Nasr.

List of champions
 
Source 

1999–00: Al-Nasr Dubai SC
2000–01: Al-Ahli
2001–02: Al-Nasr Dubai SC
2002–03: Al-Ahli
2003–04: Al-Nasr Dubai SC
2004–05: Al-Ahli
2005-06: Al-Wasl
2006-07: Al-Ahli
2007-08: Al-Ahli
2008–09: Al-Ahli
2009–10: Al-Shabab
2010-11: Al-Ahli
2011-12: Al-Ahli
2012-13: Al-Ahli
2013-14: Al-Ahli
2014-15: Al-Nasr Dubai SC

Champions

Performance by club

Source 

Handball competitions in the United Arab Emirates